Maksim Viktorovich Layushkin (born 22 August 1972) is a former Russian professional football player and referee.

Club career
As a player, he made his professional debut in the Soviet Second League in 1989 for FC Dynamo-2 Moscow.

Referee
Layushkin became a FIFA referee in 2009.  He retired as a referee in 2014.

Honours
 Russian Premier League bronze: 1993.

References

1972 births
Footballers from Moscow
Living people
Soviet footballers
Russian footballers
Russian football referees
FC Dynamo Moscow players
FC Tyumen players
FC Luch Vladivostok players
Russian Premier League players
Association football midfielders
Association football defenders